2,2,4,4-Tetramethyl-3-t-butyl-pentane-3-ol or tri-tert-butylcarbinol is an organic compound with formula C13H28O, ((H3C)3C)3COH, or tBu3COH.  It is an alcohol that can be viewed as a structural analog of a tridecane isomer (2,2,4,4-tetramethyl-3-t-butylpentane) where the central hydrogen has been replaced by a hydroxyl group -OH.

Tri-tert-butylcarbinol is arguably the most sterically hindered alcohol that has been prepared to date.  In contrast to all other known alcohols, the infrared spectrum of the liquid does not exhibit a broad OH absorption associated with intermolecular hydrogen bonding, making it interesting for research in spectroscopy.  The bulky tert-butyl groups (H3C)3C- groups attached to the central carbon prevent the formation of a O–H---O hydrogen bond with another molecule, an intermolecular interaction typical of alcohols.

Another structural analog, in which the COH group is replaced by N, is tri-tert-butylamine, a molecule predicted to be stable but has never been prepared.

References

Tertiary alcohols
Tert-butyl compounds
Alkanols